Qareh Kohneh-ye Musavi (also known as Qarkand-e Khoṭb, Qarah Kand, Qarah Kand-e Mūsá, and Qareh Kand-e Mūsavī) is a village in Sarajuy-ye Gharbi Rural District, in the Central District of Maragheh County, East Azerbaijan Province, Iran. At the 2006 census, its population was 37, in 9 families.

References 

Towns and villages in Maragheh County